Roberts Cove is a small village in County Cork, Ireland. The village consists of a number of houses, Roberts Cove Holiday Park and two pubs, The Harbour Bar and Roberts Cove Inn.   On summer days, the beach in the village is popular with day-trippers from nearby Cork City. Since 2018 there has been a dive centre based near Roberts Cove called 'Oceans of Discovery'.

The village is situated 5 km from Minane Bridge, 12 km from Carrigaline and 25 km from Cork.

References

Towns and villages in County Cork